Mesobuthus is an Asian genus of scorpions in the family Buthidae.

Species 
Mesobuthus contains the following species:
 Mesobuthus afghanus (Pocock, 1889)
 Mesobuthus barszczewskii (Birula, 1904)
 Mesobuthus birulai Kovarik et al., 2022
 Mesobuthus bogdoensis (Birula, 1896)
 Mesobuthus crucittii Kovarik et al., 2022
 Mesobuthus eupeus (C.L. Koch, 1839)
 Mesobuthus fomichevi Kovarik et al., 2022
 Mesobuthus farleyi Kovarik et al., 2022
 Mesobuthus galinae Kovarik et al., 2022
 Mesobuthus haarlovi Vachon, 1958
 Mesobuthus iranus (Birula, 1917)
 Mesobuthus kaftani Kovarik et al., 2022
 Mesobuthus kirmanensis (Birula, 1900)
 Mesobuthus macmahoni (Pocock, 1900)
 Mesobuthus marusiki Kovarik et al., 2022
 Mesobuthus mesopotamicus Penther, 1912
 Mesobuthus mirshamsii Kovarik et al., 2022
 Mesobuthus navidpouri Kovarik et al., 2022
 Mesobuthus persicus (Pocock, 1899)
 Mesobuthus philippovitschi (Birula, 1905)
 Mesobuthus phillipsi (Pocock, 1889)
 Mesobuthus rahsenae Kovarik et al., 2022
 Mesobuthus thersites (C. L. Koch, 1839)
 Mesobuthus turcicus Kovarik et al., 2022
 Mesobuthus vesiculatus (Pocock, 1899)
 Mesobuthus vignolii Kovarik et al., 2022
 Mesobuthus yagmuri Kovarik & Fet, 2022
 Mesobuthus zarudnyi Nouvruzov, Kovarik & Fet, 2022
 Mesobuthus zonsteini Kovarik et al., 2022

Mesobuthus vesiculatus 
The scorpion Mesobuthus vesiculatus is a species of scorpion in the family Buthidae. It is primarily located in Iran, ranging from the Caucaso-Iranian Highlands to Anatolian-Iranian Desert (90% of Iran). The males and females are of a modest in size, reaching lengths of 60 mm or approximately 2.4 inches. M. vesiculatus is known to have a yellowish to brownish yellow coloration with brownish segments located at or near tergite, sclerotized plate formed near dorsal portion of an arthropod, and dark reticulations on the basal half. Males in general have more pectines, comb-like teeth, 26-29 than females 20-22.

Morphology

Carapace 
Anterior of the carapace is virtually smooth, with slight emarginates. The carinae are seen to be more pronounced in males and granular in both genders. However, the posterior median carinae are small with granules on the dorsal edge of the carapace. The dorsal side of the metasomal segments are all temperately developed. Three pairs of lateral eyes are located on each side, and the median eyes are separated, from one another, by 2 ocular diameters.

Telson  
The telson is globular in shape, characteristic of the scorpions in the family Buthidae, but appears more swollen with short, small, and hooked aculeus (A. Karatas, 2012).

Chelicerae 
It has two reduced denticles at base of the ventral side of its movable finger.

Legs 
All legs have spurs that are prolateral and retro lateral, and all telotarsi have two rows of bristles ventrally and several setae dorsally. The dactyl is small and blunt, while the ungues short, stout, and weakly curved (A. Karatas, 2012). Legs III and IV contain strong tibial spurs.

Hemi spermatophore 
These are typical for this genus and family of scorpion. The outer and interior lobe of the truncal flexure are thick at the base. There are four distinct lobes with the interior lobe being the largest in size.

Differentiation of M. vesiculatus from other scorpions in family Buthidae 
M. Vesiculatus is similar to Sassanidotus gracillis because they both have a large telson and narrow metasoma but M. Vesiculatus is shown to have three granules near the terminal granule on the pedipalp movable finger. M. Vesiculatus also has very pronounced carapacial and metasomal carination, and its metasomal segment are seen to be larger than that of Olivierus caucasicus and smaller than that of M. eupeus. M. Vesiculatus is different than these three other species in that its median eyes are much larger, its vesicle and aculeus is smaller, and it has a stouter carination on its pedipalp.

References

Buthidae